Wudinna is a town in South Australia. It was proclaimed a town in 1916. It is on the Eyre Highway across the top of Eyre Peninsula. It is the seat of the Wudinna District Council.

Geography
The region is known as The granite country for its deposits of granite in the area, with tourists able to travel the granite trail to explore local landmarks. Quarrying of granite has occurred in the local area since the 1990s. Some granite blocks quarried at the Desert Rose Quarry near Mount Wudinna can be up to 8 cubic metres in volume and weigh 20 tonnes, before being cut into smaller blocks for shipping around Australia, or for export to Asian and European markets. This granite was employed in the construction of The Australian Farmer, an 8-metre (26 ft) high statue that was carved in the town as a community project to commemorate the early settlers and provide something memorable for tourists.

Mount Wudinna is thought to be Australia's second largest monolith after Uluru in the Northern Territory. The site is listed on the South Australian Heritage Register.

Wudinna is part of the Barngarla Aboriginal country and its Barngarla name is Woodina.

Climate
Wudinna experiences a cold semi-arid climate, bordering on a hot semi-arid climate (Köppen climate classification: BSk/BSh, Trewartha: BSal);  with hot, dry summers; mild to warm, dry springs and autumns; and mild, relatively dry winters.

References

External links 

Wudinna tourism
Nullarbor Net page

Towns in South Australia
Eyre Peninsula
1861 establishments in Australia